Robert William "Willy" Pickton (born October 24, 1949) is a Canadian serial killer and former pig farmer. He is suspected of being one of the most prolific serial killers in Canadian history.

After dropping out of school, Pickton left a butcher's apprenticeship to begin working full-time at his family's pig farm. He is believed to have begun his murders in the early 1980s after inheriting the farm. Arrested in 2002, he was convicted in 2007 of the second-degree murders of six women and was also the subject of a lengthy investigation that yielded evidence of numerous other murders. Pickton was charged with the deaths of an additional twenty women, many of them from Vancouver's Downtown Eastside, but these charges were stayed by the Crown in 2010. Pickton was sentenced to life in prison, with no possibility of parole for 25 years—the longest possible sentence for second-degree murder under Canadian law at the time he was sentenced.

During the trial's first day of jury evidence, the Crown stated that Pickton had confessed to 49 murders to an undercover agent from the Office of Inspector General, who was posing as a cellmate. The Crown reported that Pickton told the officer that he wanted to kill another woman to make it an even 50, and that he was caught because he was "sloppy".

Early life
His older sister Linda was sent to live with relatives in Vancouver as their parents thought that the family pig farm would be an inappropriate setting to raise a lady. Robert and his younger brother David began working at the farm at an early age. Louise was very demanding, prioritizing the pigs over the brothers' personal hygiene, and forcing them to work long hours raising the farm's livestock. She often sent them to school in unwashed, dirty clothes reeking of manure and earning the brothers the nickname "stinky piggy" from their classmates. Pickton was strongly attached to his mother and had little interaction with his abusive father.

Pickton struggled in school, being put in a special class after failing the second grade. At the age of 12, Pickton began raising a calf which became his beloved pet. Two weeks later, after failing to find it after school, he was told to check the barn where he was heartbroken to find it slaughtered. He dropped out of school in either 1963 or 1964 and began working as a meat-cutter for nearly seven years before leaving to work full-time at the farm.

Murders

Worker Bill Hiscox called the farm a "creepy-looking place" and described Pickton as a "pretty quiet guy" whose occasional bizarre behaviour, despite no evidence of substance abuse, would draw attention. 

The Pickton brothers began to neglect the site's farming operations. They registered a non-profit charity, the Piggy Palace Good Times Society, with the Canadian government in 1996, claiming to "organize, co-ordinate, manage and operate special events, functions, dances, shows and exhibitions on behalf of service organizations, sports organizations and other worthy groups". Its events included raves and wild parties featuring Vancouver sex workers and gatherings in a converted slaughterhouse on the farm at 953 Dominion Avenue in Port Coquitlam. These events attracted as many as 2,000 people. Members of the Hells Angels were known to frequent the farm.

On March 23, 1997, Pickton was charged with the attempted murder of Wendy Lynn Eistetter, whom he had stabbed several times during an altercation at the farm. Eistetter had informed police that Pickton had handcuffed her, but that she had escaped after suffering several lacerations. She told them she had disarmed him and stabbed him with his weapon. Pickton sought treatment at Eagle Ridge Hospital, while Eistetter recovered at the nearest emergency room. He was released on C$2,000 bond. The charge was dismissed in January 1998. Months later, the Picktons were sued by Port Coquitlam officials for violating zoning ordinances—neglecting the agriculture for which it had been zoned, and having "altered a large farm building on the land for the purpose of holding dances, concerts and other recreations". The Picktons ignored the legal pressure and held a 1998 New Year's Eve party, after which they were faced with an injunction banning future parties; the police were "authorized to arrest and remove any person" attending future events at the farm. The society's non-profit status was removed the following year, for inability to produce financial statements. It was subsequently disbanded.

Over the course of three years, Hiscox noticed that women who visited the farm eventually went missing. On February 6, 2002, police executed a search warrant for illegal firearms at the property. Robert and David Pickton were arrested and police obtained a second warrant using what they had seen on the property to search the farm as part of the BC Missing Women Investigation. Personal items belonging to missing women were found at the farm, which was sealed off by members of the joint RCMP–Vancouver Police Department task force. The following day, Pickton was charged with weapons offences. Both of the Picktons were later released; however Robert Pickton was kept under police surveillance.

On February 22, 2002, Robert Pickton was arrested and charged with two counts of first degree murder in the deaths of Sereena Abotsway and Mona Wilson. On April 2, three more charges were added for the murders of Jacqueline McDonell, Dianne Rock, and Heather Bottomley. A sixth charge for the murder of Andrea Joesbury was laid on April 9, followed shortly by a seventh for Brenda Wolfe. On September 20, four more charges were added for the slayings of Georgina Papin, Patricia Johnson, Helen Hallmark, and Jennifer Furminger. Four more charges for the murders of Heather Chinnock, Tanya Holyk, Sherry Irving, and Inga Hall were laid on October 3, bringing the total to fifteen. This was the largest investigation of any serial killer in Canadian history. On May 26, 2005, twelve more charges were laid against Pickton for the killings of Cara Ellis, Andrea Borhaven, Debra Lynne Jones, Marnie Frey, Tiffany Drew, Kerry Koski, Sarah de Vries, Cynthia Feliks, Angela Jardine, Wendy Crawford, Diana Melnick, and Jane Doe, bringing the total number of first-degree murder charges to 27.

Excavations continued at the farm through November 2003; the cost of the investigation is estimated to have been C$70 million by the end of 2003, according to the provincial government.  the property is fenced off, under lien by the Crown in Right of British Columbia. In the meantime, all the buildings on the property, except a small barn, had been demolished. 

Forensic analysis proved difficult because the bodies may have been left to decompose, or be eaten by insects and pigs on the farm. During the early days of the excavations, forensic anthropologists brought in heavy equipment, including two 50-foot (15-metre) flat conveyor belts and soil sifters to find traces of human remains. On March 10, 2004, the government revealed that Pickton may have ground up human flesh and mixed it with pork that he sold to the public; the province's health authority later issued a warning. Another claim was made that he fed the bodies directly to his pigs.

Preliminary inquiry
A preliminary inquiry was held in 2003, the testimony from which was covered by a publication ban until 2010. At the inquiry, the fact was revealed that Pickton had been charged with attempted murder in connection with the stabbing of Wendy Lynn Eistetter in 1997. Eistetter testified at the inquiry that after Pickton had driven her to the Port Coquitlam farm and had sex with her, he slapped a handcuff on her left hand and stabbed her in the abdomen. She stabbed Pickton in self-defense. Later, both she and Pickton were treated at the same hospital, where staff used a key they found in Pickton's pocket to remove the handcuffs from the woman's wrist.

The attempted-murder charge against Pickton was stayed on January 27, 1998, because the woman had drug addiction issues and prosecutors believed her too unstable for her testimony to help secure a conviction. The clothes and rubber boots Pickton had been wearing that evening were seized by police and left in an RCMP storage locker for more than seven years. Not until 2004 did lab testing show that the DNA of two women (Borhaven and Ellis) was on the items seized from Pickton in 1997.

In 1998, according to Vancouver police detective constable Lorimer Shenher, Shenher learned of a call made to a police tip phone line stating that Pickton should be investigated in the case of the women's disappearances. According to Shenher's account, described at length in his 2015 book about the case, he struggled to attract sufficient police resources and attention to the case until the 2002 search of Pickton's farm by the RCMP.

In 1999, Canadian police had received a tip that Pickton had a freezer filled with human flesh on his farm. Although they interviewed Pickton, who denied killing the missing women, and obtained his consent to search his farm, the police didn’t conduct a search at the time.

Trial 

Pickton's trial began on January 30, 2006, in New Westminster. Pickton pleaded not guilty to 27 charges of first-degree murder in the Supreme Court of British Columbia. The voir dire phase of the trial took most of the year to determine what evidence might be admitted before the jury. Reporters were not allowed to disclose any of the material presented in the arguments. On March 2, one of the 27 counts was rejected by Justice James Williams for lack of evidence.

On August 9, Justice Williams severed the charges, splitting them into one group of six counts and another group of 20 counts. The trial proceeded on the group of six counts. The remaining 20 counts could have been heard in a separate trial, but ultimately were stayed on August 4, 2010.  Because of the publication ban, full details of the decision are not publicly available; but the judge has explained that trying all 26 charges at once would put an unreasonable burden on the jury, as the trial could last up to two years. It also would have had an increased chance for a mistrial. The judge added that the six counts he chose had "materially different" evidence from the other 20. Office of Inspector General Senior Investigator R.J.McDougald was case agent for the investigation.

The date for the jury trial of the first six counts was initially set to start January 8, 2007, but was later postponed to January 22. On that date, Pickton faced first-degree murder charges in the deaths of Frey, Abotsway, Papin, Joesbury, Wolfe and Wilson. The media ban was lifted, and for the first time Canadians heard the details of what was found during the long investigation: skulls cut in half with hands and feet stuffed inside; the remains of one victim found stuffed in a garbage bag, and her blood-stained clothing found in Pickton's trailer; part of another victim's jawbone and teeth found beside Pickton's slaughterhouse; and a .22 calibre revolver with an attached dildo containing both his and a victim's DNA. In a videotaped recording played for the jury, Pickton claimed to have attached the dildo to his weapon as a makeshift silencer; this explanation was impractical at best, as revolvers are near-impossible to silence in this manner.

As of February 20, 2007, the following information had been presented to the court:
During Pickton's trial, lab staff testified that about 80 unidentified DNA profiles, roughly half male and half female, have been detected on evidence.
The items police found inside Pickton's trailer: A loaded .22 revolver with a dildo over the barrel and one round fired, boxes of .357 Magnum handgun ammunition, night-vision goggles, two pairs of faux fur-lined handcuffs, a syringe with three millilitres of blue liquid inside, and "Spanish fly" aphrodisiac.
A videotape of Pickton's friend Scott Chubb saying Pickton had told him a good way to kill a female heroin addict was to inject her with windshield washer fluid. A second tape was played for Pickton, in which an associate named Andrew Bellwood said Pickton mentioned killing sex workers by handcuffing and strangling them, then bleeding and gutting them before feeding them to pigs.
Photos of the contents of a garbage can found in Pickton's slaughterhouse, which held some remains of Mona Wilson.

In October 2007, a juror was accused of having made up her mind already that Pickton was innocent. The trial judge questioned the juror, saying, "It's reported to me you said from what you had seen you were certain Mr. Pickton was innocent, there was no way he could have done this. That the court system had arrested the wrong guy." The juror denied this completely. Justice Williams ruled that she could remain on the jury since it had not been proven she made the statements.

Justice James Williams suspended jury deliberations on December 6, 2007, after he discovered an error in his charge to the jury.  Earlier in the day, the jury had submitted a written question to Justice James requesting clarification of his charge, asking "Are we able to say 'yes' [i.e., find Pickton guilty] if we infer the accused acted indirectly?"

On December 9, 2007, the jury returned a verdict that Pickton is not guilty on six counts of first-degree murder, but is guilty on six counts of second-degree murder. A second-degree murder conviction carries a punishment of a life sentence, with no possibility of parole for a period between 10 and 25 years, to be set by the trial judge. On December 11, 2007, after reading 18 victim impact statements, British Columbia Supreme Court Judge Justice James Williams sentenced Pickton to life with no possibility of parole for 25 years—the maximum punishment for second-degree murder—and equal to the sentence which would have been imposed for a first-degree murder conviction. "Mr. Pickton's conduct was murderous and repeatedly so. I cannot know the details but I know this: What happened to them [the victims] was senseless and despicable," said Justice Williams in passing the sentence.

British Columbia Court of Appeal
The B.C. Court of Appeal rendered judgement in June 2009 on two appeals, one brought by the Crown (prosecution) and the other brought by the defence.

Crown appeal
On January 7, 2008, the Attorney General filed an appeal in the British Columbia Court of Appeal, against Pickton's acquittals on the first-degree murder charges. The grounds of appeal relate to a number of evidentiary rulings made by the trial judge, certain aspects of the trial judge's jury instructions, and the ruling to sever the six charges Pickton was tried on from the remaining twenty.

Some relatives of the victims in the case were taken aback by the announcement of a Crown appeal, especially because Attorney-General Wally Oppal had said a few days earlier that the prosecution would likely not appeal. Although Pickton had been acquitted on the first-degree murder charges, he was convicted of second-degree murder and received the same sentence as he would have on first-degree murder convictions. The relatives of the victims expressed concern that the convictions would be jeopardized if the Crown argued that the trial judge had made errors. Opposition critic Leonard Krog criticized the Attorney-General for not having briefed the victims' families in advance.

Oppal apologized to the victims' families for not informing them of the appeal before it was announced to the general public. Oppal also said that the appeal was filed largely for "strategic" reasons, in anticipation of an appeal by the defence. The prosecution’s rationale was that if Pickton appeals his convictions, and if that appeal is allowed, resulting in a new trial, the prosecution will want to hold that new trial on the original 26 charges of first-degree murder. But the Crown would be precluded from doing so unless it had successfully appealed the original acquittals on the first-degree murder charges, and the severance of the 26 counts into one group of six and one group of twenty.

Under the applicable rules of court, the time period for the Crown to appeal expired 30 days after December 9, when the verdicts were rendered, while the time period for the defence to appeal expired 30 days after December 11, when Pickton was sentenced. That is why the Crown announced its appeal first, even though the Crown appeal is intended to be conditional on an appeal by the defence. If the defence had not filed an appeal, then the Crown could have withdrawn its appeal.

Defence appeal
On January 9, 2008, lawyers for Pickton filed a notice of appeal in the British Columbia Court of Appeal, seeking a new trial on six counts of second-degree murder. The lawyer representing Pickton on the appeal was Gil McKinnon, who had been a Crown prosecutor in the 1970s.

The notice of appeal enumerated various areas in which the defence alleged that the trial judge erred: the main charge to the jury, the response to the jurors’ questions, amending the jury charge, similar fact evidence, and Pickton’s statements to the police.

Decisions of the Court of Appeal 
The British Columbia Court of Appeal issued its decisions on June 25, 2009, but some parts of the decisions were not publicly released because of publication bans still in effect.

The Court of Appeal dismissed the defence appeal by a 2:1 majority. Due to a dissent on a point of law, Pickton was entitled to appeal to the Supreme Court of Canada, without first seeking leave to appeal. His notice of appeal was filed in the Supreme Court of Canada on August 24, 2009.

The Court of Appeal allowed the Crown appeal, finding that the trial judge erred in excluding some evidence and in severing the 26 counts into one group of 20 counts and one group of six. The order resulting from this finding was stayed, so that the conviction on the six counts of second degree murder would not be set aside.

Supreme Court of Canada
On June 26, 2009, Pickton's lawyers confirmed that they would exercise his right to appeal to the Supreme Court of Canada. The appeal was based on the dissent in the British Columbia Court of Appeal.

While Pickton had an automatic right to appeal to the Supreme Court of Canada based on the legal issues on which Justice Donald had dissented, Pickton's lawyers applied to the Supreme Court of Canada for leave to appeal on other issues as well. On November 26, 2009, the Supreme Court of Canada granted this application for leave to appeal. The effect of this was to broaden the scope of Pickton's appeal, allowing him to raise arguments that had been rejected unanimously in the B.C. Court of Appeal (not just arguments that had been rejected by the 2–1 majority).

On July 30, 2010, the Supreme Court of Canada rendered its decision dismissing Pickton's appeal and affirming his convictions. The argument that Pickton should be granted a new trial was unanimously rejected by the Justices of the Supreme Court of Canada.

Although unanimous in its result, the Supreme Court split six to three in its legal analysis of the case. The issue was whether the trial judge made a legal error in his instructions to the jury, and in particular in his "re-instruction" responding to the jury's question about Pickton's liability if he was not the only person involved. Writing for the majority, Madam Justice Charron found that "the trial judge's response to the question posed by the jury did not adversely impact on the fairness of the trial". She further found that the trial judge's overall instructions with respect to other suspects "compendiously captured the alternative routes to liability that were realistically in issue in this trial. The jury was also correctly instructed that it could convict Mr. Pickton if the Crown proved this level of participation coupled with the requisite intent."

Mr. Justice LeBel, writing for the minority, found that the jury was not properly informed "of the legal principles which would have allowed them as triers of fact to consider evidence of Mr. Pickton's aid and encouragement to an unknown shooter, as an alternative means of imposing liability for the murders". However, LeBel J. would have applied the so-called curative proviso so as not to overturn Pickton's convictions.

Reaction to and aftermath of the court proceedings

Discontinuance of prosecution of other counts against Pickton 
B. C. Crown spokesman Neil MacKenzie announced that the prosecution of Pickton on the 20 other murder charges would likely be discontinued. "In reaching this position," he said, "the branch has taken into account the fact that any additional convictions could not result in any increase to the sentence that Mr. Pickton has already received."

Families of the victims had varied reactions to this announcement. Some were disappointed that Pickton would never be convicted of the 20 other murders, while others were relieved that the gruesome details of the murders would not be aired in court.

Vancouver Police Department management review of investigation
In 2010, the Vancouver Police Department issued a statement that an "exhaustive management review of the Missing Women Investigation" had been conducted, and the VPD would make the Review available to the public once the criminal matters are concluded and the publication bans are removed. In addition, the VPD disclosed that for several years it has "communicated privately to the Provincial Government that it believed a Public Inquiry would be necessary for an impartial examination of why it took so long for Robert Pickton to be arrested". In August of that year, the VPD released the Missing Women: Investigation Review.

VPD apology
At a press conference, Deputy Chief Constable Doug LePard of the VPD apologized to the victims' families, saying, "I wish from the bottom of my heart that we would have caught him sooner. I wish that, the several agencies involved, that we could have done better in so many ways. I wish that all the mistakes that were made, we could undo. And I wish that more lives would have been saved. So on my behalf and behalf of the Vancouver Police Department and all the men and women that worked on this investigation, I would say to the families how sorry we all are for your losses and because we did not catch this monster sooner."

Missing Women Commission of Inquiry
After Robert Pickton lost his final appeal at the Supreme Court of Canada, the Missing Women Commission of Inquiry chaired by Wally Oppal was called to examine the role of the Vancouver police and the RCMP in the disappearances and murders of women in the Downtown Eastside. Families of the missing and murdered women have been calling for public hearings since before Pickton was arrested and eventually convicted of six murders. The Commission's final report submission to the Attorney General was dated November 19, 2012, and was released to the public on December 17. During the inquiry, lawyers for some of the victims' families sought to have an unpublished 289-page manuscript authored by former police investigator Lori Shenher  entered as evidence and made entirely public. Several passages were read into the inquiry's record but Commissioner Oppal declined to publicize the entire manuscript.

Transfer to penitentiary
During a court hearing on August 4, 2010, Judge Williams stated that Pickton should be committed to a federal penitentiary; up to that point he had been held at a provincial pretrial institution. In June 2018, he was allegedly transferred from Kent Institution in British Columbia to another penitentiary in Port-Cartier, Quebec.

Stay of final 20 murder charges 
Pickton had faced a further 20 first degree murder charges involving other female victims from Vancouver's Downtown Eastside. On February 26, 2008, a family member of one of the 20 women named as alleged victims told the media that the Crown had told her a trial on the further 20 counts might not proceed.

On August 4, 2010, Crown prosecutors stayed the pending murder charges against Pickton, ending the prospect of any further trials.

The 20 charges were formally stayed by crown counsel Melissa Gillespie during a British Columbia Supreme Court hearing at New Westminster.

Most (but not all) of the publication bans in the case were lifted by the trial judge, James Williams of the British Columbia Supreme Court, after lawyers spent hours in court going through the various complicated bans.

On August 6, 2010, various media outlets released a transcript of conversations between an RCMP undercover operator and Pickton in his holding cell. While the RCMP censored the undercover officer's name throughout most of the document, his name was left uncensored in several portions of the document that the RCMP released to the public. This uncensored version was available to the public, through Global News, CTV News, and the Vancouver Sun, for about an hour before being pulled and re-edited. The extent of any damage this mistake caused the undercover officer is not known.

Victims
On December 9, 2007, Pickton was convicted of second-degree murder in the deaths of six women:

 Count 1, Sereena Abotsway (born August 20, 1971), age 29 when she disappeared in August 2001; her foster mother reported her missing on August 22, 2001.
 Count 2, Mona Lee Wilson (born January 13, 1975), age 26 when she went to her doctor on November 30, 2001, and was reported missing that night.
 Count 6, Andrea Joesbury, age 22 when last seen in June 2001; reported missing June 8, 2001.
 Count 7, Brenda Ann Wolfe, age 32 when last seen in February 1999; reported missing on April 25, 2000.
 Count 16, Marnie Lee Frey, last seen August 1997; reported missing on December 29, 1997.Vancouver Police Missing Persons Case #98-209922.
 Count 11, Georgina Faith Papin, last seen in January 1999 and reported missing in March 2001.

More victims 
Pickton also stood accused of first-degree murder in the deaths of 20 other women until these charges were stayed on August 4, 2010.

 Count 3, Jacqueline Michelle McDonell, 22 when she was last seen in January 1999. Vancouver Police Missing Persons Case # 99-039699.
 Count 4, Dianne Rosemary Rock (born September 2, 1967), 34 when last seen on October 19, 2001. Reported missing December 13, 2001.
 Count 5, Heather Kathleen Bottomley (born August 17, 1973), 27 when she was last seen (and reported missing) on April 17, 2001.
 Count 8, Jennifer Lynn Furminger, last seen in 1999.
 Count 9, Helen Mae Hallmark, last seen August 1997. Vancouver Police Missing Persons Case #98-226384.
 Count 10, Patricia Rose Johnson, last seen in March 2001.
 Count 12, Heather Chinnook, 30 when last seen in April 2001.
 Count 13, Tanya Holyk, 23 when last seen in October 1996.
 Count 14, Sherry Irving, 24 when last seen in 1997.
 Count 15, Inga Monique Hall, 46 when last seen in February 1998. Vancouver Police Missing Persons Case # 98-047919.
 Count 17, Tiffany Drew, last seen December 1999.
 Count 18, Sarah de Vries, last seen April 1998.
 Count 19, Cynthia Feliks, last seen in December 1997.
 Count 20, Angela Rebecca Jardine, last seen November 20, 1998, between 3:30- 4p.m. at Oppenheimer Park at a rally in the downtown Eastside of Vancouver, British Columbia, Canada. Vancouver Police Missing Persons Case # 98.286097.
 Count 21, Diana Melnick, last seen in December 1995.
 Count 22, Jane Doe, charge lifted; see below.
 Count 23, Debra Lynne Jones, last seen in December 2000.
 Count 24, Wendy Crawford, last seen in December 1999.
 Count 25, Kerry Koski, last seen in January 1998.
 Count 26, Andrea Fay Borhaven, last seen in March 1997. Vancouver Police Missing Persons Case # 99.105703.
 Count 27, Cara Louise Ellis aka Nicky Trimble (born April 13, 1971), 25 when last seen in 1996. Reported missing October 2002.

As of March 2, 2006, the murder charge involving the unidentified victim has been lifted. Pickton refused to enter a plea on the charge involving this victim, known in the proceedings as Jane Doe, so the court registered a not-guilty plea on his behalf. "The count as drawn fails to meet the minimal requirement set out in Section 581 of the Criminal Code. Accordingly, it must be quashed", wrote Justice James Williams. The detailed reasons for the judge's ruling cannot be reported in Canada because of the publication ban covering this stage of the trial.

Pickton is implicated in the murders of the following women, but charges have not yet been laid (incomplete list):

Mary Ann Clark aka Nancy Greek, 25, disappeared in August 1991 from downtown Victoria.
Yvonne Marie Boen (sometimes used the surname England) (born November 30, 1967), 33 when last seen on March 16, 2001, and reported missing on March 21, 2001.
Dawn Teresa Crey, reported missing in December 2000. Crey is the main subject of a 2006 documentary film about murdered and missing Aboriginal women in Canada, entitled Finding Dawn.
Two unidentified women.

After Pickton was arrested, many people started coming forward and talking to the police about what had taken place at the farm. One of the witnesses that came forward was Lynn Ellingsen. Ellingsen claimed to have seen Pickton skinning a woman hanging from a meat hook years earlier and that she did not tell anyone about it out of fear of losing her life. Additionally, Ellingsen admitted that she blackmailed Pickton about the incident on more than one occasion.

The victims' children filed a civil lawsuit in May 2013 against the Vancouver Police Department, the Royal Canadian Mounted Police and the Crown for failing to protect the victims. They reached a settlement in March 2014, where each of the children was to be compensated C$50,000, without an admission of liability.

August 2006 "Pickton Letters" 
In August 2006, Thomas Loudamy, a 27-year-old Fremont, California, resident, claimed that he had received three letters from Robert Pickton in response to letters Loudamy sent under an assumed identity.

In the letters, Pickton allegedly speaks with concern about the expense of the investigation, asserts his innocence, quotes and refers to the Bible, praises the trial judge, and responds in detail to (fictional) information in Loudamy's letters, which were written in the guise of Mya Barnett, a "down on her luck" woman.

The news of the letters' existence was broken by The Vancouver Sun, in an exclusive published on Saturday, September 2, 2006, and as of that date, neither law enforcement nor any representative of Pickton has verified the authenticity of the letters. The Sun, however, has undertaken several actions to confirm the documents' authenticity, including:
Confirming that the outgoing stamps are consistent with those of the North Fraser Pretrial Centre (NFPC), where Pickton was being held;
Confirming through a representative of Canada Post that the outgoing stamps are not forgeries; and
Confirming that the machine (identifiable with a serial number included in the stamp) used to stamp the envelopes is the machine used by the NFPC.

Loudamy claimed not to have kept copies of his outgoing letters to Pickton, and as of September 4, 2006, no information on their existence has been forthcoming from Pickton or his representatives.

Loudamy had a history of writing to accused and convicted criminals, in some instances under his own identity (as with his correspondence with Clifford Olson), and in others in the guise of a character he believes will be more readily accepted by the targets of the letters. Loudamy, an aspiring journalist, claimed that his motivation in releasing the letters was to help the public gain insights into Pickton.

Autobiography 
In 2016, a book that was claimed to have been written by Pickton titled Pickton: In his Own Words was released for sale. The publication and marketing of the book initiated controversy, critical petitions, and actions by government to stop Pickton from profiting from the work.

Allegedly, Pickton was able to get his manuscript out of prison by passing it to a former cellmate, who then sent it to a retired construction worker from California named Michael Chilldres. Chilldres then typed up the manuscript and is credited as the author of the 144-page book. Provincial Solicitor General Mike Morris and an online petition on Change.org each sought to remove the book from sale on Amazon.com. Premier Christy Clark expressed interest in introducing new legislation similar to existing laws in Alberta, Saskatchewan, Nova Scotia, and Ontario that prevent criminals profiting from such books. Colorado publisher Outskirts Press ceased publication of the book and asked Amazon to remove it from their site after finding out that—although Chilldres’s name was on the book cover—the author was actually an incarcerated criminal.

In art, entertainment and media 
A major plotline in the Canadian crime drama Da Vinci's Inquest deals with a spate of missing women thought to be victims of a prolific serial killer hunting in Vancouver's Downtown Eastside. Pickton is not directly referred to by name, but starting in the show's fifth season characters and advertisements made reference to "the pig farm" in relation to the case.

Killer Pickton is a 2005 American horror film loosely based on Robert Pickton's killings.

In 2015, a film with the working title of Full Flood began production in Vancouver by CBC-TV. Based on Stevie Cameron's book On The Farm, it was to use the life experiences of Pickton's victims for a fictional story about women in the Downtown Eastside who became victims of a serial killer. Pickton was portrayed by Ben Cotton in the film. In 2016, the film was released under the title Unclaimed, and also as On the Farm in certain markets.

See also 
Gilbert Paul Jordan
List of serial killers by country
List of serial killers by number of victims

References

Further reading

External links

Women Commission of Inquiry ("Oppal") Report (November 19, 2012)

R. v. Pickton,  (July 30, 2010)
R. v. Pickton, decision of the Court of Appeal for British Columbia (June 25, 2009) (defence appeal)
R. v. Pickton, decision of the Court of Appeal for British Columbia (June 25, 2009) (Crown appeal)
R. v. Pickton, decision of the Supreme Court of British Columbia (December 13, 2007) (ruling re: re-instructing the jury)
R. v. Pickton, decision of the Supreme Court of British Columbia (January 16, 2007) (ruling re: media application to access and publish exhibits #1)
Robert William Pickton Trial Information (Court Services, Ministry of Attorney General)
Covering The Trial: Former Sex Trade Workers Work As Citizen Correspondents For Orato
Backgrounder
TruTV article on Robert Pickton

BBC Article on Pickton (2007-01-21)

Pat Casanova testimony, June 4–6, 2007
History of Sex Work in Vancouver (downloadable PDF book written by sex workers)
PDFs of the Pickton letters obtained by The Vancouver Sun.
Interviews and oral histories with victims' families and community workers, part of research stored at Simon Fraser University Library.

1949 births
1980s murders in Canada
1990s murders in Canada
2000s murders in Canada
20th-century Canadian criminals
21st-century Canadian criminals
Canadian cannibals
Canadian farmers
Canadian male criminals
Canadian people convicted of murder
Canadian prisoners sentenced to life imprisonment
Canadian serial killers
Crime in British Columbia
Crimes against sex workers
Downtown Eastside
Living people
Male serial killers
People convicted of murder by Canada
People from Port Coquitlam
Prisoners sentenced to life imprisonment by Canada
Publication bans in Canadian case law
Violence against Indigenous women in Canada
Violence against women in Canada